Robin Hawkins (born 11 February 1986) is a vocalist and bassist. He was a member of Welsh band The Automatic.

Personal life
Rob studied at Cowbridge Comprehensive School, completing his A-levels and going on to take a chance with The Automatic in his gap year. Originally Rob was more interested in playing flute, joining the Cardiff and Vale Youth Orchestra, however later, at the age of 12 after buying a bass from Automatic guitarist James Frost, he taught himself to play and eventually saved enough money to afford his Fender USA Jazz Bass. Hawkins speaks Esperanto as a hobby. He graduated from Cardiff University with a first-class honours degree in Computer Science. His final year project was an investigation of musicality perception in an evolutionary context, the results of which were published in ICMC'14.

Musical career
Lead vocalist and bassist, Hawkins also has been seen playing a variety of other instruments for The Automatic, most notably the flute during the band's performances of Gold Digger and the synthesizer during performances of "This Is A Fix".

Notable appearances
On 9 January 2007, he and former band-mate Alex Pennie stood in for Zane Lowe on BBC Radio 1, in a series of stand-ins whilst Zane Lowe was on holiday. The line-up also included fellow band on B-Unique Records, Kaiser Chiefs, as well as The View, Snow Patrol, and The Zutons.

Equipment
Rob predominantly uses a Fender USA Jazz Bass. He has used and purchased various bases, however prefers his Jazz bass to other models he has used.

 Ashdown bass amps
 Fender USA Jazz Bass
 Boss Bass Overdrive
 Boss Chromatic Tuner
 SansAmp Bass DI (x2)
 Dunlop .73mm Plectrums
 Musicman Stingray Electric Bass

References

Welsh bass guitarists
The Automatic members
Living people
People from Cowbridge
1986 births
21st-century bass guitarists